Winkton is a hamlet in the historic county of Hampshire and the ceremonial county of Dorset, England. Together with the village of Burton, it is part of the civil parish of Burton and Winkton, in the district of Bournemouth, Christchurch and Poole.

Winkton is on the borders of the New Forest, and is adjacent to the River Avon. The town of Christchurch lies to the south. The former airfield RAF Winkton was constructed nearby.

History 

Winkton was listed in the Domesday Book under the name Weringetone. It was described as follows by John Wise in his The New Forest - Its History and its Scenery, published in 1867:

Politics 
Winkton is part of the Christchurch parliamentary constituency for elections to the House of Commons. It is currently represented by Conservative MP Christopher Chope.

References

External links 
 
 Winkton, at Vision of Britain
 Burton and Winkton Parish Council

Hamlets in Dorset
Bournemouth, Christchurch and Poole
Areas of Christchurch, Dorset